Two Rock is a mountain in Ireland.

Two Rock(s) may also refer to:

Two Rock, California
Two Rocks, Western Australia

See also
Two Rock Ranch Station, former name of a Coast Guard training facility in Sonoma and Marin Counties, California